Victory rolls are a women's hairstyle that was popular from 1940 to 1945, with a recent rise during the 21st century, characterized by voluminous curls of hair that are either on top of the head or frame the face. Victory rolls are closely associated with the pin-up look and are achieved using various backcombing, rolling, pinning, and curling techniques. 

The creator of the victory rolls is unknown, but several theories exist on the style's origins. The hairstyle has received a resurgence in popularity via themed parties and the swing dance scene.

History 
Victory rolls were most popular during 1940 to 1945, during World War II. Some theories exist as to the style's origin, the most commonly repeated of which are linked with World War II and the postwar movements. One theory associates victory rolls with the aviation aerobatic maneuver of planes that would spin horizontally as a sign of victory or celebration, as the style was supposed to resemble the movements of the aircraft. Another associates it with the allies' victory over Germany, as it was symbolic of the women at home helping their loved ones fighting overseas. 

The style was popularized by film actresses such as Ingrid Bergman and the majority wore this style to frame their face so it fit the beauty standards of the day. The style could be worn with two victory rolls or with a single roll. After 1945 the popularity of the victory rolls declined as the style was now to have the top of the head smooth, however some women still wore victory rolls on the sides of their head.

Victory rolls have experienced a resurgence in vintage-era theme parties and in the swing dance scene.

Style 
During the World War II era, there were many variants of large curls so it was not a single hairstyle but several. However, what they all had in common was a “V” (for victory) in the shape of the curls on the sides of the head and it could even be an inverted “V”. Other styles included a “V” shape in the parting of the hair on the top of the head. In fact, one popular theme during the era included three dots and dashes alongside the “V” which were on gloves, handkerchiefs, etc., and one variety of the hairstyle even included three small curls for the “dots” and one long curl for the “dash” while the bottom of the “V” began at the nape of the neck and continued on each side of the head, up to the temples.

To achieve a victory roll women would use hairspray and various techniques such as backcombing, rolling, pinning, and curling so that rolls would either sit on the top of their head or frame their faces. Women with thinner faces could wear their hair in front of their ears so it would look wider. Women with more disposable income would most likely go to the salon every day to get their hair done so they could achieve a shiny and slick look, whereas lower class women would have to do it themselves. Some women would also purchase wigs to avoid having to style their hair every day.

Modern Day Victory Rolls 
Victory Rolls and the Pin-Up look has risen back up in popularity as businesses take advantage of the vintage look and have artists in the modern world try to replicate or pay homage to a vintage fashion statement.

From businesses like Gok's How to Look Good Naked, in the article Shops & fashion to Dare to bare it, Lauren Pyrah in February of 2011, finds this beauty salon to have taken an old-style and made their own spin on the fashion statement, with it now being used to display lingerie. A beauty salon has started using the pin-up style, including victory roll hair-dos, to portray a pin-up girl for photos. One of the photographers, Claire Burns, said that "It's all about feeling special." With the goals aiming to give a "pampering experience with professional pictures to keep."

Modernly, in June of 2016, Truss Artistic Director Paulo Persil pays homage to pin-up girls from the '40s and '50s as creates an updated collection of the vintage style. In Marianne Dougherty's article PIN-UP GIRLS, she discusses his modern take on a different step-by-step than in the past, whilst paying respects to the pin-up girls like those Alberto Vargas made famous in the 1940s. His step-by-step describes different iconic looks like the Glamour Bun, Daring Waves, Luxurious Asymmetry, and the Semi-Fixed Sweep. He showcases the preparation and execution to the reader in order for it to be repeated if wanting to replicate the look.

See also
 List of hairstyles

References

Hairstyles
1940s fashion